Dan Catsis (born 30 November 1959) is an English musician who served as the guitarist for the punk band Glaxo Babies, which he founded with Geoff Alsopp and Tom Nichols in 1977 in Bristol, England. He was also a member of The Pop Group between 1979 and 1980, performing bass guitar on their second album and two singles. In 2010, he rejoined The Pop Group as they embarked on their reunion tour.

Discography

References

Living people
Musicians from Bristol
English bass guitarists
Male bass guitarists
English male guitarists
British post-punk musicians
The Pop Group members
British rock bass guitarists
1959 births